Shahrak-e Sunk (also Romanized as Shahrak-e Sūnk) is a village in Sepidar Rural District of Armand District, Khanmirza County, Chaharmahal and Bakhtiari province, Iran. At the 2006 census, its population was 1,379 in 279 households. The following census in 2011 counted 1,527 people in 389 households. The latest census in 2016 showed a population of 1,602 people in 392 households; it is the center of its rural district.

References 

Khanmirza County

Populated places in Chaharmahal and Bakhtiari Province

Populated places in Khanmirza County